The Diocese of Mainz, historically known in English as Mentz as well as by its French name Mayence, is a Latin Church ecclesiastical territory or diocese of the Catholic Church in Germany. It was founded in 304, promoted in 780 to Metropolitan Archbishopric of Mainz and demoted back in 1802 to bishopric. The diocese is suffragan diocese in the ecclesiastical province of the metropolitan Archdiocese of Freiburg. Its district is located in the states of Rhineland-Palatinate and Hesse. The seat of the diocese is in Mainz at the Cathedral dedicated to Saints Martin and Stephen.

History 
 Established in 340 as Diocese of Mainz
 Gained territory in 755 from the suppressed Diocese of Erfurt
 Promoted in 780 as Metropolitan Archdiocese of Mainz
 Demoted (back) on the 29th of November, 1801 to Diocese of Mainz (gained territory from Diocese of Metz, Diocese of Speyer, Metropolitan Archdiocese of Trier and Diocese of Worms)
 Lost territories repeatedly; in April 1818 to Diocese of Konstanz, Diocese of Speyer and Diocese of Wurzburg; in July 1821 to Diocese of Paderborn; in August 1821 to Diocese of Fulda and to establish Diocese of Limburg, and exchanged territory with Diocese of Trier; in March 1824 to Diocese of Hildesheim.

Organization, extent and statistics 
Under Article 14 of the Reichskonkordat of 1933, which remains in force, the determination of the bishop to head the episcopal see and the composition of the chapter are governed by the provisions of Baden Concordat of 1932.

As per 2014, it pastorally served 749,583 Catholics (25.9% of 2,891,000 total) on 7,692 km² in 319 parishes, 504 priests (409 diocesan, 95 religious), 124 deacons, 447 lay religious (132 brothers, 315 sisters), 19 seminarians.

It is divided into 20 deaneries, which in turn are divided into 136 pastoral care units. In 2007 these parish associations or parish groups included all 335 parishes and other chaplaincies of the diocese (as of 2007). Pastoral units on the parish level have been introduced as a result of a profound structural change in the Catholic Church in Germany in many dioceses, the constitution of these units was determined by particular law [law of a particular region or territory], i.e., allowing for differences from one diocese to another. In the diocese of Mainz a parish group may be several parishes merged under the leadership of a single pastor. The parishes retain their church and state church legal personality. The pastor is attached to a pastoral team and a pastoral council. Parish associations, however, are combinations of several parishes, each with its own pastor. Several parish groups can join together to form a parochial associations.

Catholic Education

Catholic Private Schools

The most important educational institution of the Diocese is the Catholic University of Applied Sciences, Mainz. Besides the Roman Catholic Diocese of Mainz and the (arch)dioceses of Cologne, Limburg,  Speyer and Trier belong to the initiators of this university .
There are also other schools as the Edith-Stein-Schule in Darmstadt, Liebfrauenschule in Bensheim, the Episcopal Willigis-Gymnasium in Mainz, Abendgymnasium Ketteler of Mainz and the Episcopal College Willigis secondary school in Mainz.

Facilities at state universities 
The diocese maintains three facilities at state universities. The most important of them is the Catholic Theological Faculty at the University of Mainz. In addition, there are at University of Giessen, the Institute for Catholic theology and their didactics, which is located at the Department of History and Cultural Studies. At the Technische Universität Darmstadt is an institute for theology and social ethics.

Bildungswerk der Diözese Mainz 
The Bildungswerk der Diözese Mainz (educational works of the diocese of Mainz) promotes "... the church's adult education in the diocese from the parish to the diocesan level ..."  The Bildungswerk is also a member of the Catholic Adult Education Hesse - Regional Working Group.

Other educational institutions 
 Institut für Kirchenmusik Mainz: training institution for catholic Church musicians

Major churches

Cathedral and Major basilicas 
 Mainz Cathedral
 Worms Cathedral
 Basilica of St. Martin, Bingen am Rhein
 Basilica of Sts. Marcellinus and Petrus, Seligenstadt
 Basilica of the Immaculate Conception, Sts. Peter and Paul, Ilbenstadt

Other well-known churches 
 St. Stephen's Church, Mainz with Chagall windows
 St. Ludwig, Darmstadt, dome of Neoclassicism
 Collegiate church, Pfaffen-Schwabenheim
 Church of Our Lady, Worms
 Chapel of St. Roch, Bingen

Liturgical calendar 

Local feasts of the diocese are:

 5. January:John Neumann, Redemptorist priest and fourth Bishop of Philadelphia 
 4. February: Rabanus Maurus, Frankish Benedictine monk, archbishop of Mainz
 14. February: Valentine, 3rd-century Christian martyr
 23. February: Willigis, Archbishop of Mainz and statesman of the Holy Roman Empire
 27. April: Peter Canisius, Jesuit priest who supported the Catholic faith during the Protestant Reformation in Germany
 15. May: Rupert of Bingen, patron saint of pilgrims
 2. June: Marcellinus and Peter, 4th-century Christian martyrs in Rome
 5. June: Boniface, leading figure in the Anglo-Saxon mission to the German parts of the Frankish Empire.
 10. June: Bardo of Mainz, presided over the Synod of Mainz in 1049 which denounced simony and priest marriage
 21. June: Alban of Mainz, priest, missionary, and martyr.
 27. June: Creszenz, Aureus, Theonest saints venerated by the Church of Mainz
 4. July: anniversary of the consecration of Mainz cathedral
 16. August: Roch, Christian saint, confessor, specially invoked against the plague
 6. September: Anniversary of the consecration of churches who do not know the day of their consecration  	
 17. September: Hildegard of Bingen,  writer, composer, philosopher, Christian mystic, Benedictine abbess, visionary, and polymath. 
 28. September: Leoba, Anglo-Saxon nun who was part of Boniface's mission to the Germans
 16. October: Lullus, first permanent archbishop of Mainz, succeeding Saint Boniface
 26. October: Amandus of Straßburg, confessor, first bishop of Straßburg.
 29. October: Ferrutius, Roman soldier, martyr in Mogontiacum
 11. November: Martin of Tours, soldier, later Bishop of Tours
 27. November: Bilihildis, Frankish noblewoman, founder and abbess of the monastery of Altmünster near Mainz

List of Bishops
For bishops and archbishops before 1802, see Elector_of_Mainz#Bishops_and_archbishops. 

Joseph Ludwig Colmar (1802–1818)
Joseph Vitus Burg (1829–1833)
Johann Jakob Humann (1833–1834)
Petrus Leopold Kaiser (1834–1848)
Wilhelm Emmanuel Freiherr von Ketteler (1850–1877)
sede vacante (1877-1886)
Paul Leopold Haffner (1886–1899)
Heinrich Brück (1900–1903)
Georg Heinrich Kirstein (1903–1921)
Ludwig Maria Hugo (1921–1935)
Albert Stohr (1935–1961)
Hermann Cardinal Volk (1962–1982)
Karl Cardinal Lehmann (1983–2016)
Peter Kohlgraf (2017– ...)

Auxiliary bishops

Archdiocese (to 1802)

Diocese (1802–present)
 Joseph Maria Reuß (Reuss) (1954–1978)
 Wolfgang Rolly (1972–2003)
 Franziskus Eisenbach (1988–2002)
 Werner Guballa (2003–2012)
 Ulrich Neymeyr (2003–2014)
 Udo Markus Bentz (2015– )

See also 
 List of Catholic dioceses in Germany

References

Sources and external links 
 GCatholic 
 
 Literature 
 Stefan Burkhardt, Mit Stab und Schwert. Bilder, Träger und Funktionen erzbischöflicher Herrschaft zur Zeit Kaiser Friedrich Barbarossas. Die Erzbistümer Köln und Mainz im Vergleich. Thorbecke, Ostfildern, 2008
 Friedhelm Jürgensmeier: Das Bistum Mainz. Von der Römerzeit bis zum II. Vatikanischen Konzil, Knecht Verlag, Frankfurt am Main, 1988, 
 Hans Werner Nopper, Die vorbonifatianischen Mainzer Bischöfe. Mülheim, 2001
 Franz Usinger, Das Bistum Mainz unter französischer Herrschaft (1798-1814). Falk, Mainz, 1911

 
Mainz
Organisations based in Mainz
Mainz diocese
Mainz diocese
Mainz